Thomas Hansueli Zurbuchen (born 1968) is a Swiss-American astrophysicist. From October 2016 until the end of 2022, he was the longest continually running Associate Administrator for the Science Mission Directorate at NASA. Prior to this, he was Professor of Space Science and Aerospace Engineering at the University of Michigan, where he helped found the Center for Entrepreneurship.

Personal life and education 
Zurbuchen studied physics at the University of Bern, with a minor in mathematics, and was awarded the PhD in 1996 with a thesis entitled "Turbulence in the interplanetary medium and its implications on the dynamics of minor ions".

Career 
Zurbuchen joined the University of Michigan as a research associate, and was made professor in 2008. His scientific research focuses on solar and heliospheric physics, experimental space research, and space systems; he is also well known for his personal work on innovation and entrepreneurship.

He served as team leader for the development of one of the scientific instruments aboard NASA's Messenger spacecraft to Mercury, the Fast Imaging Plasma Spectrometer. He chaired the National Academy of Sciences committee that produced a report in 2016 on Cubesats.

From October 2016 until the end of 2022, he was the longest continually running Associate Administrator for the Science Mission Directorate at NASA. During this time, he launched 37 missions and started another 54.  Among them were the James Webb Space Telescope, Perseverance and Ingenuity Mars Landings, DART, and many others for which he was responsible, and to the success of which he contributed majorly. 

As of January 2023, Zurbuchen works as an international speaker.

Awards 
 2004: US Presidential Early Career Award for Scientists and Engineers.
 2018: Heinrich-Greinacher-Prize of the University of Bern
 2020: NASA Outstanding Leadership Medal
 2021: US Presidential Rank Award
 2021: Honorary doctorate degree (Dr. of Science) of Northern Michigan University. 
 2022: NASA Distinguished Service Medal
 2022: Wernher von Braun Distinguished Science Award. 
 2022: Honorary doctorate degree (Dr. h. c.) of the ETH Zurich

References

External links

 Personal web site for Thomas Zurbuchen
 Web site for Thomas Zurbuchen at NASA
 Web site for Thomas Zurbuchen at the University of Michigan

American astrophysicists
Swiss astrophysicists
NASA astrophysicists
1968 births
Living people
University of Bern alumni
University of Michigan faculty